Valleau Tavern is a historic tavern located at Cochecton in Sullivan County, New York.  It was built in 1829 and is a three-story vernacular building of the Federal period with a gable roof.  It is clapboard sided of post and beam construction and features a one-story porch with a hipped roof.

It was added to the National Register of Historic Places in 1992.

References

Federal architecture in New York (state)
Commercial buildings completed in 1829
Buildings and structures in Sullivan County, New York
Taverns in New York (state)
National Register of Historic Places in Sullivan County, New York
Taverns on the National Register of Historic Places in New York (state)